Srđan Čebinac (Serbian Cyrillic: Cpђaн Чeбинaц; born 8 December 1939 in Belgrade) is a Serbian former football midfielder and manager. He played once for SFR Yugoslavia national team.

He is the twin brother of the late Zvezdan Čebinac.

References

1939 births
Living people
Serbian footballers
Yugoslav footballers
Yugoslavia international footballers
Association football midfielders
FK Partizan players
OFK Beograd players
1. FC Köln players
Fortuna Sittard players
FK Austria Wien players
FC Aarau players
Yugoslav First League players
Bundesliga players
Eredivisie players
Austrian Football Bundesliga players
Serbian expatriate footballers
Yugoslav expatriate footballers
Expatriate footballers in West Germany
Expatriate footballers in Germany
Expatriate footballers in the Netherlands
Expatriate footballers in Switzerland
Expatriate footballers in Austria
Serbian football managers
Serbian twins
Twin sportspeople